Events from 2021 in Easter Island.

Events 
Ongoing – COVID-19 pandemic in Easter Island

 29 January – The  Tapati Festival is held without visitors for the first time.
 25 October – Easter Islanders vote against reopening the island to tourists in a referendum.

References 

2021 in Easter Island
2020s in Easter Island
Years of the 21st century in Easter Island
Easter Island